Italian singer Mahmood has released two studio albums, one extended play, nineteen singles (including two as a featured artist) and eleven music videos. After winning the 69th Sanremo Music Festival with his number one single "Soldi", he released his debut studio album, Gioventù bruciata in February 2019, which topped the Italian albums chart. "Soldi" also became a hit in several European countries. In April 2019, Mahmood was featured on the number one single "Calipso" by Charlie Charles and Dardust. Between 2019 and 2020, he also released the singles "Barrio", "Rapide", "Moonlight popolare" and "Dorado", all of which entered the top ten in Italy.

Mahmood frequently appeared as a featured artists in tracks by Italian hip hop artists such as Gué Pequeno and Marracash. He also penned songs for Italian pop singers, including Marco Mengoni, Francesca Michielin and Elodie.

Studio albums

Extended plays

Singles

As lead artist

As featured artist

Other charted songs

Guest appearances

Music videos

Songwriting credits

Footnotes

References

External links

Discographies of Italian artists